Petrus Castrus is a Portuguese progressive rock band, formed in 1971 by brothers Pedro Castro and José Castro. Petrus Castrus emerged as one of the first Symphonic Rock bands in Portugal, receiving the status of "Fathers of Portuguese Rock" together with other famous bands.

Influences
In the beginning Petrus Castrus were quite influenced by bands like Pink Floyd, Procol Harum, The Nice and Electric Light Orchestra.

Members
The initial Petrus Castrus contained members:
 Pedro Castro: vocals, guitar and bass 
 José Castro: keyboards, synthesizer and vocals 
 Júlio Pereira: guitar
 Rui Reis: organ
 João Seixas: drums

Júlio Pereira left the band shortly after the recording of Mestre. The band suspended activity in 1974 and Rui Reis and João Seixas left to form the band Plutónicos, and later the heavy metal band Ferro & Fogo (Iron & Fire).

In 1976, the Castro brothers returned with a new lineup:
 Pedro Castro: vocals, guitar and bass
 José Castro: keyboards, synthesizer and vocal
 Urbano Oliveira: drums

Two years later, their album Ascenção e Queda was made with contributions from:
 Fernando Girão: guitar
 Rui Serrão: bass
 Lena d'Água: vocals
 Nuno Rodrigues: vocals

Discography
 Marasmo (EP, 1971)
 Tudo Isto, Tudo Mais (All This, Everything More) (EP, 1972)
 Mestre (Master) (LP, 1973; CD, 2007)
 A Bananeira (single, 1974)
 Cândida (single, 1977)
 Ascenção e Queda (Ascent and Fall) (LP, 1978)
 Agente Altamente Secreto (Highly Secret Agent) (single, 1977, was on bonus CD of Mestre)

External links
 Petrus Castrus on progarchives

Portuguese progressive rock groups
Portuguese rock music groups